The 85th Ohio Infantry Regiment, sometimes 85th Ohio Volunteer Infantry (or 85th OVI) was an infantry regiment in the Union Army during the American Civil War.  Although recruited as a regiment, it never achieved full strength and was only able to muster four companies, which served as a battalion (often referred to as "Zinn's Battalion", a reference to Major Peter Zinn).

Service
The 85th Ohio Infantry was organized at Camp Chase in Columbus, Ohio May through June 1862 and mustered in on June 10, 1862, for three months service under Colonel Charles W. B. Allison.

The regiment moved to Kentucky and participated in operations against John Hunt Morgan July 1862. Performed prison guard duty at Camp Chase until September, then moved to Cincinnati, Ohio, and participated in the operations for the defense of that city against Edmund Kirby Smith's threatened attack August–September.

The 85th Ohio mustered out of the service September 23 and September 27, 1862.

Casualties
The regiment lost a total of 10 enlisted men, all due to disease.

Commanders
 Colonel Charles W. B. Allison

See also

 List of Ohio Civil War units
 Ohio in the Civil War

References
 Dyer, Frederick H. A Compendium of the War of the Rebellion (Des Moines, IA:  Dyer Pub. Co.), 1908.
 Ohio Roster Commission. Official Roster of the Soldiers of the State of Ohio in the War on the Rebellion, 1861–1865, Compiled Under the Direction of the Roster Commission (Akron, OH:  Werner Co.), 1886–1895.
 Reid, Whitelaw. Ohio in the War: Her Statesmen, Her Generals, and Soldiers (Cincinnati, OH:  Moore, Wilstach, & Baldwin), 1868. 
Attribution

External links
 Ohio in the Civil War: 85th Ohio Volunteer Infantry by Larry Stevens

Military units and formations established in 1862
Military units and formations disestablished in 1862
Units and formations of the Union Army from Ohio
1862 establishments in Ohio